Probreviceps uluguruensis is a species of frog in the family Brevicipitidae. It is endemic to the Uluguru Mountains, Tanzania. Common names Uluguru big-fingered frog and Uluguru forest frog have been proposed for it.

Description
The eyes are small and the tympanum is not visible. The dorsum is rough and cream to brown in colour. There is a pair of pale lateral bands that in some females might be deep red. The lower surfaces are purple. The eyes are pale to orange-brown. The male advertisement call is a brief, low-pitched chirp.

Habitat and conservation
It is a semi-fossorial frog that lives on the ground. The eggs are deposited under grass tufts in burrows and have direct development (i.e., there is no free-living larval stage).

This species tolerates marginally disturbed habitats and can locally be relatively common. However, its range is relatively small and its habitat can be adversely affected by human-induced fires and forest loss. It occurs in the Uluguru Nature Reserve, relatively well-protected reserve.

References

Uluguruensis
Frogs of Africa
Amphibians of Tanzania
Endemic fauna of Tanzania
Amphibians described in 1925
Taxa named by Arthur Loveridge
Taxonomy articles created by Polbot